Llanes (the Concejo de Llanes, Conceyu de Llanes in Asturian language) is a municipality of the province of Asturias, in northern Spain. Stretching for about 30 km along the coast at the extreme east of the province, Llanes is bounded to the south by the high ridge of the limestone Sierra del Cuera, which rises to over 1,100 m. The region is part of the Costa Verde (Green Coast) of Spain, which is known for its spectacular coastal scenery, with 32 white sand beaches, and mountains covered with a deep green mantle. Llanes lies to the north of the Picos de Europa, a mountain range whose geology is almost entirely of limestone karst.

Most of the inhabitants of the district live on the coastal plain, on which the largest town is Llanes itself, with a population of about 4,000 out of the total for the district of about 13,000. The folklore, food, and fiestas of the region are famous for their colour and history.

Town 

Llanes is a traditional fishing port, with an active harbour and many notable monuments and traditions; 
Parts of the surviving town walls date to 1206 with a medieval Tower of Llanes remaining. There is a romanic-gothic Basilica dedicated to the Virgin Mary. One plaque commemorates the 65 sailors from Llanes who sailed on the three ships it fitted out for the Spanish Armada in 1588 (the Santa Ana, the San Nicolas, and the Santelmo). Another plaque commemorates the September 26, 1517 visit of Emperor Charles V who stayed for two nights, when on his way to Valladolid to be crowned King of Castile.
In the 1990s the landmark old Theatre (Teatro Benevente), built as part of the main bridge over the river, was pulled down.

Llanes economy is boosted by tourists mostly from the rest of Spain in the summer. The town has traditional shops and restaurants, both in and around the town, and the zona de copas is lively at night in summer. Three beaches and a cliff-top walk, the Paseo de San Pedro, add to the coastal atmosphere. Nearby is the Playa de Gulpiyuri.

Parishes
Llanes is divided into 28 parishes:

Andrín
Ardisana
Barro
Caldueñu
Carranzo
Celorio
Cue
Hontoria
La Borbolla
Llanes
Los Callejos
Los Carriles
Malatería
Meré
Naves
Nueva
Parres
Pendueles
Po
Porrúa
Posada de Llanes
Pría
Purón
Rales
San Roque del Acebal
Tresgrandas
Vibaño
Vidiago

Mountains 
From all of the district of Llanes the view to the south is dominated by the limestone mountain wall, which rises steeply to 744 m at L'Abá.
The ridge forming the wall shields the view of the higher Sierra del Cuera above, of which the highest point (in Llanes) is La Peña Blanca, 1177 m. Between the two ridges there are hidden valleys, draining into cave systems. The largest of these valleys is La Llosa de Viango. Unlike the heights of the Picos de Europa further to the south, these valleys are green and pastoral. The mountains are part of the Cordillera Cantábrica, which runs across most of the north and northwest of Spain.

From September 6, 1937 to September 22, 1937, 5,000 men of the Republican forces held off over 33,000 Nationalists, in this area, in an epic resistance which became known as the Battle of El Mazuco.

Caves 
 
The district contains numerous caves, including a site of archaeological interest at Nueva, and the Cueva Bolado near La Pereda which also contains ancient art as well as open passages.

There are also several significant 'wild' cave systems, including

 the Rales system
 El Cuevón de Pruneda, near Purón.

These systems were first systematically explored by speleologists from the Oxford University Cave Club  and from Speleogroup.

In addition, it is suspected that there is a significant cave system underlying La Llosa de Viango.

Fiestas 
In Llanes itself, the patron saint of the town, Nuestra Señora del Conceyu, is celebrated with a Fiesta on 15 August. In addition, there are three big summer Fiestas in the town: 22 July La Magdalena, 16 August San Roque, and 8 September La Guía. These Fiestas are independently organized by three groups, known as "Bandos", with followers in the Llanes population; these have a long and well-known rivalry, and each tries every year to outdo the others and stage the best festivities.

Outside the town, the various parishes and localities in the district celebrate the usual diversity of Fiestas in honour of their patron saints, with emphasis on La Hoguera ("The bonfire"), which consists of the felling of a mountain eucalyptus which is then erected in the village after removing the branches and bark. This is celebrated in several villages, including Celorio, Balmori, and Pancar (where they carry out the entire ritual without the help of their neighbours).

Also famous is the Noche de las Brujas of Barro (a very traditional and popular celebration centred on Asturian mythology), as is the celebration of Santa Ana, the patron saint of Naves, thanks to the free concert given by popular musicians.

Sport

See also 
Iglesia de la Virgen de la Guía (Llanes)

References

External links 
 Llanes official portal 
 llanes.as 
 Guide to Llanes 
 A guide to Asturias in English 
 A virtual tour of Llanes 
 LLANESNET Portal sobre Llanes y sus gentes 
 Ayuntamiento de Llanes 
 Information about Llanes concejo 
 Photos about Llanes 

 
Municipalities in Asturias